Stephen Edward "Steve" Zuckerman (born November 7, 1947) is an American television and theater director. He began his career in the theater. After being trained at the University of Michigan and the Yale School of Drama, he went on to be the Associate Artistic Director of the IRT Theater where he directed celebrated productions of Odets "Clash By Night" and Ibsen's "Brand" among many others. He was Director of Play Development at the Circle in the Square Theater and  the Associate Artistic Director of the WPA Theater where he directed the premiere of "Nuts" which moved directly to Broadway and received two Tony Nominations and two Drama Desk Nominations.

Since 1987, he has amassed a number television credits including Full House, The Golden Girls, Murphy Brown, Empty Nest, Friends, The Drew Carey Show, Everybody Loves Raymond, Zoey 101, According to Jim, Melissa & Joey, Anger Management and among other series.

Filmography

References

External links

Steve Zuckerman - Official Site

1947 births
American television directors
American theatre directors
Living people
University of Michigan alumni
Yale School of Drama alumni